Granada Bridge may refer to:

 Granada Bridge (Granada, Colorado), listed on the NRHP in Colorado
 Granada Bridge (Ormond Beach) in Florida